This article is about the particular significance of the year 1901 to Wales and its people.

Incumbents

Archdruid of the National Eisteddfod of Wales – Hwfa Môn

Lord Lieutenant of Anglesey – Sir Richard Henry Williams-Bulkeley, 12th Baronet  
Lord Lieutenant of Brecknockshire – Joseph Bailey, 1st Baron Glanusk
Lord Lieutenant of Caernarvonshire – John Ernest Greaves
Lord Lieutenant of Cardiganshire – Herbert Davies-Evans
Lord Lieutenant of Carmarthenshire – Sir James Williams-Drummond, 4th Baronet
Lord Lieutenant of Denbighshire – William Cornwallis-West    
Lord Lieutenant of Flintshire – Hugh Robert Hughes 
Lord Lieutenant of Glamorgan – Robert Windsor-Clive, 1st Earl of Plymouth
Lord Lieutenant of Merionethshire – W. R. M. Wynne 
Lord Lieutenant of Monmouthshire – Godfrey Morgan, 1st Viscount Tredegar*Lord Lieutenant of Montgomeryshire – Sir Herbert Williams-Wynn, 7th Baronet 
Lord Lieutenant of Pembrokeshire – Frederick Campbell, 3rd Earl Cawdor
Lord Lieutenant of Radnorshire – Powlett Milbank

Bishop of Bangor – Watkin Williams 
Bishop of Llandaff – Richard Lewis
Bishop of St Asaph – A. G. Edwards (later Archbishop of Wales) 
Bishop of St Davids – John Owen

Events
January – Samuel Thomas Evans becomes the last QC appointed by Queen Victoria.
22 January – Albert Edward, Prince of Wales accedes to the throne as King Edward VII of the United Kingdom, following the death of Queen Victoria.
31 March – The 10-yearly Census of England and Wales is taken. The population of Wales is shown to have topped two million for the first time in history. Over 15% of the population speak Welsh as their sole language.
3 April – Frederick Rutherfoord Harris, MP for Monmouth Boroughs, is unseated for alleged electoral malpractice.
17 April – Mawddwy Railway passenger services are suspended "pending repairs"; goods services are also suspended between May and October.
7 May – In the by-election at Monmouth Boroughs, Joseph Lawrence becomes the new Conservative MP.
24 May – 81 miners are killed in an accident at Universal Colliery, Senghenydd.
10 September – Twelve miners are killed in a mining accident at Llanbradach Colliery in Glamorgan.
9 November 
Prince George, Duke of Cornwall and York (later George V) and his wife Mary of Teck officially become Prince and Princess of Wales.
Shipping magnate Alfred Lewis Jones is awarded a knighthood.
December – The Rhymney Railway opens Caerphilly railway works.
Gomer Berry and William Ewart Berry co-found Advertising World.
Samuel Walker Griffith helps draft the Australian constitution.
Construction of Port Talbot Steelworks begins.
Construction of the 156-room Grand Hotel at Llandudno, the largest in Wales at the time.

Arts and literature
Arthur Machen joins Frank Benson's travelling theatre company.

Awards
National Eisteddfod of Wales – held in Merthyr Tydfil
Chair – Evan Rees, "Y Diwigiwr"
Crown – John Gwili Jenkins

New books
Morris Williams (Nicander) – Damhegion Esop ar Gân (published posthumously)
The Dau Wynne – A Maid of Cymru

Sport
Rugby Union
9 February – Scotland beat Wales 18–8 at Inverleith, Edinburgh.
Pontypool RFC and Tenby United RFC are founded.

Births
4 January – Lonza Bowdler, Wales international rugby player (died 1963)
20 January – Cecil Griffiths, athlete (died 1973)
18 February – Will Owen, politician (died 1981)
27 February – Iorwerth Peate, social anthropologist, poet and author, founder of the Welsh Folk Museum (died 1982)
4 March – Edward Prosser Rhys, journalist and poet (died 1945)
1 April – Tom Jones, cricketer (died 1935) 
18 April – Mel Rosser, dual-code international rugby player (died 1988)
22 May – David Morgan Jenkins, rugby player (died 1968)
22 June – Naunton Wayne, actor (died 1970)
1 July – Candy Evans, miner, boxer, dual-code international rugby union and professional rugby league footballer (died 1952)
3 September – Alexander Tudor-Hart, doctor and political activist (died 1992)
10 September – Rowe Harding, Wales and British Lions rugby player (died 1991)
9 November – Rhys Davies, writer (died 1978)
10 December – Ivor Jones, rugby player (died 1982)
24 December – Hilary Marquand, economist and MP (died 1972)
date unknown – Ivor R. Davies, Welsh-descended organist and composer (died 1970)

Deaths
20 January – James Harvey Insole, English-born colliery proprietor, 79
7 February – Leonard Watkins, Wales international rugby union player, 41
21 February – John Deffett Francis, artist, 85
14 May – Fanny Price-Gwynne, polymath, 82
June – Abel Jones (Bardd Crwst), balladeer, 71
1 June
John Viriamu Jones, scientist, 45
Morgan Albert Ellis, Welsh-American preacher (born 1832)
30 June – John Jones Griffiths
18 August – Evan James, rugby player, 32
26 August – Robert Ricketts Evans, executioner
5 September – Rhys Gwesyn Jones, minister and author, 75
15 September – John Richards (Isalaw), musician, 58
22 September – William Davies (Mynorydd), artist, 75
24 November – Evan Lewis, Dean of Bangor, 83
26 November – Robert Clayton, cricketer, 57
16 December – David Lewis, Archdeacon of Carmarthen, 62

References

Wales